Refiloe Jane (born 4 August 1992) is a South African professional soccer player who plays as a midfielder for Italian Serie A club US Sassuolo and the South Africa women's national team. She previously played for Tshwane University of Technology and Canberra United in the W-League in Australia.

Club career
On 20 August 2018 to 2019, Canberra United announced they had signed Jane for the 2018–19 W-League Season. She joined the club alongside fellow South African Rhoda Mulaudzi, they are the first players from South Africa to play in the W-League.

After parting ways with the Australian team Canberra United in April 2019, Refiloe signed for Italian Serie A Women's League outfit AC Milan on a one-year deal for an undisclosed fee.

International career
Jane represented South Africa at the 2012 London Olympics. In September 2014, Jane was named to the roster for the 2014 African Women's Championship in Namibia.

Jane was named to the South African squad for the 2016 Summer Olympics. She played every minute of the team's three group games.

In February 2019, Jane made her 100th appearance for South Africa.

International goals
Scores and results list South Africa's goal tally first

References

External links
 
 South Africa player profile
 

Living people
1992 births
Sportspeople from Soweto
Women's association football defenders
South African women's soccer players
South Africa women's international soccer players
Footballers at the 2012 Summer Olympics
Footballers at the 2016 Summer Olympics
Olympic soccer players of South Africa
FIFA Century Club
2019 FIFA Women's World Cup players
Expatriate women's footballers in Italy
South African expatriate sportspeople in Italy
A.C. Milan Women players
Serie A (women's football) players
Canberra United FC players
A-League Women players
Expatriate women's soccer players in Australia
South African expatriate sportspeople in Australia